Racing Club de Montevideo is a football club from Montevideo in Uruguay. It currently participates in the Uruguayan Primera División Profesional since winning the Torneo Competencia in 2022.

Racing CM is known as "La Escuelita" (The Little School) due to the high standard of players that have emerged from their teams. Racing is one of Uruguay's traditional teams, in terms of victories and fans. However, in the last few years, Racing has faced economic problems and struggled to remain consistent and perform well at the Uruguayan League. 

Racing's main rival is Fénix, with whom they contest the Clásico del Oeste.

Performance in CONMEBOL competitions
Copa Libertadores: 1 appearance
2010: Second Round

Players

Current squad

Out on loan

Notable coaches

  Julio "Cascarilla" Morales (1983–87)
  Ricardo "Tato" Ortíz (July 1, 1992 – Dec 31, 1992)
  Adolfo Barán (July 1, 1998 – June 30, 1999)
  Gerardo Pelusso (Jan 1, 2000 – Dec 31, 2000)
  Julio Acuña (April 17, 2002 – Dec 31, 2002), (Jan 1, 2007 – July 1, 2007)
  Eduardo Favaro (Aug 1, 2007 – Dec 27, 2007)
  José Puente (Jan 1, 2008 – Dec 31, 2008)
  Juan Verzeri (July 1, 2008 – May 6, 2010)
  José Puente (2010)
  Álvaro Regueira (Oct 2010)
  Edgardo Arias (Oct 4, 2010 – April 19, 2011)
  Osvaldo Streccia (July 1, 2011 – Dec 21, 2011)
  Jorge Giordano (Dec 23, 2011 – Oct 8, 2012)
  Miguel Angel Piazza (Oct 9, 2012 – Jan 3, 2013)
  Juan Tejera (Jan 5, 2013 – June 30, 2013)
  Rosario Martínez (July 1, 2013 – Dec 31, 2013)
  Mauricio Larriera (Jan 3, 2014–)

Titles
Segunda División: 5
1955, 1958, 1974, 1989, 2008

 Divisional Intermedia: 3
1923, 1929, 1930

Other teams 
Racing Club de Montevideo also has a esports division, with a squad of FIFA video game series, competing in the championship organized by the Uruguayan Virtual Football Federation.

References

External links

Official website 

 
Association football clubs established in 1919
Football clubs in Uruguay
1919 establishments in Uruguay
Esports teams based in Uruguay